Achleck is a small settlement in the north-west of the Isle of Mull in Argyll and Bute, Scotland.

References

Villages on the Isle of Mull